Giarre-Riposto (also known as Ionia) was a comune (municipality) that existed from 1939 to 1945 in the province of Catania, Italy.

History
The municipality of Giarre-Riposto was created by the fascist regime in 1939, merging the municipalities of Giarre and Riposto which had previously been administratively separate.

In 1942, the municipality of Giarre-Riposto had been re-named to Ionia.

Following the end of World War II, the two towns were separated once more by legislative decree and both had their names and administrative capabilities restored.

People
Franco Battiato (1945–2021), singer-songwriter

References

Former municipalities of Sicily
Populated places established in 1935
Populated places disestablished in 1944
Province of Catania